Mihkel Kerem (born 23 January 1981 in Tallinn) is an Estonian composer and violinist.

Kerem graduated from Tallinn Music High School in 1999. In 2002 he graduated from Estonian Academy of Music and Theatre, studying two disciplines: violin and composition. In 2006 he finished his master's thesis at Royal Music College in London.

He has been violinist in several musical groups, e.g. in Kerem Quartet, and Tobias String Quartet.

Works

Orchestral
 1996: Symphony No. 1
 Symphony No. 2 [unfinished]
 2003: Symphony No. 3 For the Victims of Communism
 Divertimento for orchestra (2007)
 Fanfare for symphony orchestra (2010)

Concertante
 Concerto for viola and orchestra (1994)
 Lament (Lamento) for cello or viola and string orchestra (2008, 2009)

Chamber music
 Sonata No. 1 for violin and piano (1993–1994)
 Sonata No. 2 for violin and piano (1996)
 Nimetud lood (Nameless Pieces) for clarinet, viola and piano (2006)
 Sonata No. 3 for violin and piano (2006)
 Sonata for viola and piano (2007)

References

External links
 

1981 births
Living people
21st-century Estonian composers
Estonian violinists
Estonian Academy of Music and Theatre alumni
Musicians from Tallinn